FK Jastrebac Niš is a defunct football club based in Niš, Serbia.

History
Simultaneously with the final breakup of Yugoslavia, the club placed first in the Yugoslav Inter-Republic League (Group East), earning promotion to the second tier. They subsequently won the Second League of FR Yugoslavia in the 1992–93 season and took promotion to the First League (I/B League). However, the club finished bottom of the table and suffered relegation after just one season. They spent the next two years in the Second League (1994–95 and 1995–96), before suffering relegation to the Serbian League Niš.

Honours
Second League of FR Yugoslavia (Tier 2)
 1992–93
Yugoslav Inter-Republic League (Tier 3)
 1991–92 (Group East)

Notable players
This is a list of players who have played at full international level.
  Ivica Kralj
  Saša Zorić
For a list of all FK Jastrebac Niš players with a Wikipedia article, see :Category:FK Jastrebac Niš players.

References

External links
 Club page at Srbijasport

1946 establishments in Serbia
2010 disestablishments in Serbia
Association football clubs disestablished in 2010
Association football clubs established in 1946
Defunct football clubs in Serbia
Sport in Niš